The steel wheel of a steam locomotive and other older types of rolling stock were usually fitted with a steel tire (American English) or tyre (in British English, Australian English and others) to provide a replaceable wearing element on a costly wheel.

Installation
Replacing a whole wheel because of a worn contact surface was expensive, so older types of railway wheels were fitted with a replaceable steel tire. The tire is a hoop of steel that is fitted around the steel wheel centre. The tire is machined with a shoulder on its outer face to locate it on the wheel centre, and a groove on the inside diameter of the flange face. 
The inside diameter of the tire is machined to be slightly less than the diameter of the wheel centre on which it is mounted, to give an interference fit.  

The tire is fitted by heating to a controlled temperature, avoiding overheating.  This causes the tire to expand.  The wheel centre, usually already mounted on the axle, is lowered into the tire which is flange side up.  The tire cools, and the retaining ring (a shaped steel bar rolled into a hoop, known as a Gibson ring, after its inventor J. Gibson of the British Great Western Railway) is fitted into the groove.  Hydraulically operated rolls swage the groove down on to the retaining ring.  

The tire is primarily held in place by its interference fit. The shoulder on the outside and the retaining ring also keep the tire in place if the interference fit is lost.  This is most often due to severe drag braking down a gradient, or due to an error in the machining.

Removal of a worn tire is by machining out the retaining ring and heating the tire to relax the interference fit.

Some steam locomotive wheels had tires bolted through the rim, or with a second smaller shoulder machined on the inside face of the tire.  This shoulder was severely limited in size as it had to pass over the wheel centre for assembly.  

Tires of different designs were fitted to wheels with wooden centers (Mansell wheels in the UK) and to various other types.

The use of tires is becoming obsolete.  The utilisation of traditional freight wagons was often so low that tires never needed renewal, so it was cheaper to fit a one-piece ("monoblock") wheel.  Monoblock wheels are lighter and offer better integrity as there is no tire to come loose. Modern flow-line repair lines are disrupted by the inspection of the wheel centre once the tire is removed, possibly generating extra rectification work, and the need to make each tire fit its allocated wheel centre.  Monoblock wheels are now more economical.

Causes of damage
The most usual cause of damage is drag braking on severe gradients.  Because the brake blocks apply directly on the tire, it is heated up, relaxing the interference fit.  It is not feasible to fit the tire with such a heavy interference as to eliminate this risk entirely, and the retaining ring will ensure that the tire can only rotate on the wheel center, maintaining its alignment.  In rare instances the rotation could be so severe as to wear the retaining ring down till it breaks, which could result in derailment.  

Severe braking or low adhesion may stop the rotation of the wheels while the vehicle is still moving can cause a flat spot on the tire and localized heat damage to the tire material. 

Worn tires or tires with flats are reprofiled on a wheel lathe if there is sufficient thickness of material remaining.

A damaged railway tire was the cause of the Eschede train disaster, when a tire failed on a high-speed ICE train, causing it to derail and killing 101 people.

Non-steel railway tires

Some trains, mostly metros and people movers, have rubber tires, including some lines of the Paris Métro, the Mexico City Metro, the Caracas Metro, the Montreal Metro, Sapporo Subway, Seattle Center Monorail, Taipei Rapid Transit System, Santiago Metro and the Uijeongbu LRT

References 

 ISO 1005 Parts 1-9
 BS 5892 Parts 1-6

Train wheels